"Soul Deep" is a song by The Box Tops.  It was the third of three singles released from their 1969 Dimensions LP. Lead vocals were provided by Alex Chilton.

The Box Tops' song became an international Top 40 hit, charting modestly at #22 in the UK and #18 in the U.S.  It reached the Top 10 in Australia (#7) and in Canada (#9).  "Soul Deep" did best in South Africa, where it reached #2.

"Soul Deep" became the group's final U.S. Top 40 entry.  Regionally, it peaked at #3 on KHJ (Los Angeles) on 30 July and on WLS (Chicago) on 18–25 August.  "Soul Deep" was also part of the title of the group's 1996 anthology.

Eddy Arnold cover
"Soul Deep" was covered by Eddy Arnold in 1970.  The track is included on his album, Love and Guitars.  Arnold had a Top 40 Country as well as Adult Contemporary hit with the song in both the U.S. and Canada.

Other cover versions
Preceding the Box Tops' version by some three years, a version had been recorded by Robbie Lane and the Disciples in 1966 but only released in 1993 on the compilation LP Backtrax.

Clarence Carter covered it in his album "Testifyin'," released in July 1969.

Roberta Flack covered it on her 1977 album Blue Lights in the Basement.

Gary U.S. Bonds covered the song in 1982, and it became a modest hit in the UK.

The song was covered in 1994 by the alternative rock band Gin Blossoms, featured on the soundtrack to the film Speed.

Chart history

Weekly charts

The Box Tops

Eddy Arnold

Gary U.S. Bonds

Year-end charts

References

External links
  (The Box Tops)

1969 songs
1969 singles
1970 singles
1982 singles
The Box Tops songs
Eddy Arnold songs
Gary U.S. Bonds songs
Bell Records singles
RCA Records singles
Songs written by Wayne Carson